László Jeszenszky (14 July 1927 – 10 December 2003) was a Hungarian middle-distance runner. He competed in the 3000 metres steeplechase at the 1952 Summer Olympics and the 1956 Summer Olympics.

References

1927 births
2003 deaths
Athletes (track and field) at the 1952 Summer Olympics
Athletes (track and field) at the 1956 Summer Olympics
Hungarian male middle-distance runners
Hungarian male steeplechase runners
Olympic athletes of Hungary
Place of birth missing
20th-century Hungarian people